James Harold Maples (January 28, 1941 – March 29, 2014) was an American football linebacker who played college football for Baylor and professional football in the National Football League (NFL) for the Baltimore Colts during the 1963 season.

Early years
A native of Mount Vernon, Texas, he played college football at Baylor University.

Professional football
He played professional football for the Baltimore Colts during the 1963 season, appearing in five NFL games. He suffered injuries that required two operations on his knees and prevented him from appearing in the second half of the 1963 season or in any games during the 1964 season. He was traded to the Pittsburgh Steelers in July 1965.

Later years
After retiring from football, Maples lived in McAllen, Texas, and worked in retail management. He died in 2014 at age 73.

His brother Bobby Maples also played in the NFL.

References

1941 births
2014 deaths
American football linebackers
Baltimore Colts players
Baylor Bears football players
People from Mount Vernon, Texas
Players of American football from Texas